The Auburn Plainsman is the student-run news organization for Auburn University in Auburn, Alabama. It has notably received awards for excellence from the Associated Collegiate Press and is the most decorated student publication in the history of the National Pacemaker competition.

As of February 2021, The Plainsman is primarily an online publication, updating its website daily with articles, photographs and weekly podcasts. The Plainsman prints four to six special editions each year which are freely distributed throughout the campus and surrounding cities of Auburn and Opelika. 

The editor-in-chief is selected by the Auburn University Communications Board, a group of faculty, students and professional journalists. In turn, the editor hires a paid and volunteer staff to run the paper. The Plainsman currently has a staff exceeding 50 paid and volunteer student-journalists.

The Plainsman is a self-supported publication and receives no regular student or state taxpayer revenue. The Plainsman is primarily composed of five different sections: News, culture, sports, opinion and multimedia.

History 
Founded by the school's two literary societies, the Wirts and Websterians, students began publishing a newspaper for the Agricultural and Mechanical College of Alabama in 1893. The students called it the Orange and Blue after the colors worn by the football team formed a year earlier.

The paper began as twice monthly publication. Through its early years, the paper was small. It resembled other newspapers of the day. The first major change in the paper's traditional production came in 1922, when the name went from the Orange and Blue to The Auburn Plainsman. Name changes since then were minor, as editors have dropped and picked up the word "Auburn," but the word became a permanent fixture in the title in 1961-62, a year after the Alabama Legislature changed the school's name for the final time, from Alabama Polytechnic Institute to Auburn University.

Aside from the paper's name change, the frequency of publication has shifted. It went from one edition per week to two editions per week in the fall of 1928. The Plainsman returned to a weekly publication schedule some time in the late 1940s.

The first female editor was Martha Rand, in 1944. She was followed by Mimi Simms. Since Rand and Simms, only 10 women have served as editor.

The paper launched its online presence in early 1997 with only selected articles placed on a university-based website. In fall 1997, the first online editor, Karl Sebelius, moved the paper to its current online home at theplainsman.com. The online edition has received three Online Pacemakers.

The 2000–01 editor, Rachel Davis, lobbied the Board of Communications (Comm Board), a university committee charged with overseeing student media such as The Plainsman and student radio station WEGL, for a change in how Plainsman editors were chosen. The long-standing tradition of election by the student body was abandoned. Now, the Comm Board and its special advisory board select the editor, who takes a series of tests before interviewing for the job.

In February 2021, editor Jack West moved The Plainsman to its current format as a primarily online publication, citing printing costs and the general trend of the journalism industry as reasons for the change. In an editorial announcing the change, West noted to readers, the vast majority of which accessed The Plainsman's content online, "Ironically, for most of you reading this, there won’t be a huge amount of change."

In recent years, Plainsman stories have been picked up by almost every national major media outlet, including stories covering a triple homicide at an off-campus apartment complex, the confession of Toomer's Tree poisoner Harvey Updyke and the theft of more than 1,000 copies of The Plainsman by members of Auburn SGA. These stories were picked up by organizations such as AP, ESPN, NBC, ABC, FOX, CNN and more.

Awards 
One of collegiate journalism's highest prizes is the National Pacemaker Awards, handed out since 1928 by the Associated Collegiate Press. The Auburn Plainsman is the most decorated student publication in the competition.

 The Auburn Plainsmans Pacemakers:
 2020-2021, Pacemaker Finalist, Jack West, editor
2019–2020, Online Pacemaker, Eduardo Medina, editor
 2018–19, National Pacemaker, Chip Brownlee, editor
 2018–19, Online Pacemaker Finalist, Chip Brownlee, editor
 2017–18, Pacemaker Finalist, Chip Brownlee, editor
 2017–18, Online Pacemaker, Chip Brownlee, editor
 2016–17, National Pacemaker, Corey Williams, editor
 2015–16, Pacemaker Finalist, Jim Little, editor
 2013–14, National Pacemaker, Kelsey Davis, editor
 2011–12, National Pacemaker, Miranda Dollarhide, editor
 2004–05, National Pacemaker, James Diffee, editor
 2003–04, Online Pacemaker, David Mackey, online editor
 2002–03, National Pacemaker, Adam Jones, editor
 2001–02, National Pacemaker, Napo Monasterio, editor
 2000–01, National Pacemaker, Rachel Davis, editor
 1999–00, National Pacemaker, Bill Barrow, editor
 1998–99, National Pacemaker, Lee Davidson, editor
 1996–97, National Pacemaker, Greg Walker, editor
 1994–95, National Pacemaker, Jan Clifford, editor
 1993–94, National Pacemaker, Tom Strother, editor
 1992–93, Pacemaker Finalist, Seth Blomeley, editor
 1990–91, Regional Pacemaker, Wade Williams, editor
 1988–89, Regional Pacemaker, David Sharp, editor
 1987–88, Regional Pacemaker, Bret Pippen, editor
 1982–83, Regional Pacemaker, Tim Dorsey, editor
 1981–82, Regional Pacemaker, Steve Parish, editor
 1979–80, National Pacemaker, Rick Harmon, editor
 1975–76, National Pacemaker, Steele Holman, editor
 1974–75, National Pacemaker, Rheta Grimsley Johnson, editor
 1973–74, National Pacemaker, Bill Wood, editor
 1972–73, National Pacemaker, Thorn Botsford, editor
 1971–72, National Pacemaker, John Samford, editor
 1967–68, National Pacemaker, Bruce Nichols, editor
 1966–67, National Pacemaker, Jerry Brown, editor

2018 Better Newspaper Contest – Alabama Press Association

References

External links
The Auburn Plainsman
The Plainsman Digital Collection, Auburn University Digital Library (includes all issues 1922-2015)

Auburn University
Student newspapers published in Alabama
Newspapers established in 1893
1893 establishments in Alabama